Amelanchier canadensis (bilberry, Canadian serviceberry, chuckle-berry, currant-tree, juneberry, shad-blow serviceberry, shad-blow, shadbush, shadbush serviceberry, sugarplum, thicket serviceberry) is a species of Amelanchier native to eastern North America in Canada from Newfoundland west to southern Ontario, and in the United States from Maine south to Alabama. It is largely restricted to wet sites, particularly on the Atlantic coastal plain, growing at altitudes from sea level up to 200 m.

Growth
The leaves are alternate, simple, ovate to ovate-oblong, 1–5.5 cm long and 1.8–2.8 cm broad with a rounded to sub-acute apex; they are downy below, and have a serrated margin and an 8–15 mm petiole. 
The flowers are produced in early spring in loose racemes 4–6 cm long at the ends of the branches; each raceme has four to ten flowers. The flower has five white petals 7.6–11 mm long and 2–4 mm broad, and 20 stamens. 
The fruit is a pome, 7–10 mm diameter, dark purple when ripe; it is edible and sweet. Fruits become ripe in June and July in its native range.

Uses
It is used as a medicinal plant, food, and ornamental plant. It is sometimes made into bonsai.

References

External links
 
 Evergreen.ca Native Plant Database

canadensis
Trees of Canada
Trees of the United States
Medicinal plants of North America
Trees of the Southeastern United States
Trees of the Northeastern United States
Trees of the Eastern United States